Pankaj Kumar (born 12 November 1999) is an Indian cricketer. He made his first-class debut on 17 December 2019, for Jharkhand in the 2019–20 Ranji Trophy. He made his Twenty20 debut on 12 January 2021, for Jharkhand in the 2020–21 Syed Mushtaq Ali Trophy.

References

External links
 

1999 births
Living people
Indian cricketers
Jharkhand cricketers
Place of birth missing (living people)